Annauir is a village in Valencia, Spain. It is part of the municipality of Xàtiva.

Towns in Spain
Populated places in the Province of Valencia
Geography of the Province of Valencia